Sekharipuram Narayaniyer Seshadri (1937–1986) was an Indian control engineer and the head of the Reactor Control Division of the Bhabha Atomic Research Centre. He established the control systems for the Satellite Receiving Station at Arvi, near Pune and the Ooty Radio Telescope. Subsequent to the bombing of Air India Flight 182 in June 1985, he conducted the examination of the cockpit voice recorder and air traffic control tapes.

Seshadri was known for his work on the control systems for satellite communication, earth station antennas, tracking and telemetering of rockets, and traction motors for high power locomotives and his researches have been documented in a number of articles. He was an elected fellow of the Indian Academy of Sciences. The Council of Scientific and Industrial Research, the apex agency of the Government of India for scientific research, awarded him the Shanti Swarup Bhatnagar Prize for Science and Technology, one of the highest Indian science awards for his contributions to Engineering Sciences in 1978. He died on 2 February 1986, at the age of 48. The Indian Physics Association has instituted an annual award, S. N. Seshadri Memorial Instrumentation Award to recognize excellence in indigenous instrumentation development in physical sciences.

Selected bibliography

References 

Recipients of the Shanti Swarup Bhatnagar Award in Engineering Science
1937 births
Indian scientific authors
Fellows of the Indian Academy of Sciences
1986 deaths
20th-century Indian engineers
Engineers from Kerala